Brevundimonas terrae is a Gram-negative and rod-shaped bacterium from the genus of Brevundimonas which has been isolated from alkaline soil from Kwangchun in Korea.

References

Bacteria described in 2006
Caulobacterales